Ringgold High School is a public four-year comprehensive high school located in Catoosa County, Georgia, United States, in the outskirts of Chattanooga, Tennessee. It serves the community of Ringgold and was the first high school to be founded in Catoosa County.

On April 27, 2011, Ringgold High School was heavily damaged by an EF4 tornado. For the remainder of the 2010–2011 school year, Ringgold students attended Heritage High School in the afternoons while Heritage students attended school in the mornings.

Athletics
The school currently represents Region 7-AAA in athletics. Athletics offered at Ringgold include football, baseball, volleyball, boys' basketball, girls' basketball, wrestling, dance team, cheerleading, boys' soccer, girls' soccer, cross country, track & field, boys' golf, girls' golf, softball, boys' tennis, and girls' tennis.

References

External links
 

Schools in Catoosa County, Georgia
Educational institutions in the United States with year of establishment missing
Public high schools in Georgia (U.S. state)
1957 establishments in Georgia (U.S. state)